Sodium acetylacetonate is an organic compound with the nominal formula Na[CH(C(O)CH3)2].  This white, water-soluble solid is the conjugate base of acetylacetone.

Preparation
The compound is prepared by deprotonation of acetylacetone:

NaOH  +  CH2(C(O)CH3)2  →  NaCH(C(O)CH3)2  +  H2O
The anhydrous compound is produced by deprotonation with sodium hydride in an aprotic solvent such as THF:
NaH  +  CH2(C(O)CH3)2  →  NaCH(C(O)CH3)2  +  H2

Reactions
Oxidation of the salt gives tetraacetylethane.  

With metal salts, it reacts to give metal acetylacetonate complexes.

Alkylation of sodium acetylacetonate can result in both O-alkylation and C-alkylation.  The former gives the enol ether and the latter gives 3-substituted derivative of acetylacetone.

Structure
The structure of the monohydrate has been established by X-ray crystallography.  The sodium cation is bonded to the enolate oxygen centers.

References

Diketones
Chelating agents
Ligands
Acetylacetonate complexes
3-Hydroxypropenals